Gary Schmidt may refer to:

 Gary D. Schmidt (born 1957), American children's writer
 Gary J. Schmidt (born 1947), former member of the Wisconsin State Assembly

See also
Gary Schmitt (born 1952), American political activist